Hellinsia sichuana is a moth of the family Pterophoridae. It is found in south-western China (Sichuan).

References

Moths described in 1992
sichuana
Moths of Asia